Yoo Kyoung-Youl  (born 15 August 1978) is a former South Korean footballer who last played for Cheonan City in the Korea National League.

Club career 
On 28 February 2011, Yoo signed a two-year contract with Daegu FC. The following year, he became the club's captain.

International carer

References

External links

 National Team Player Record 
 

1978 births
Living people
Association football defenders
South Korean footballers
Gimcheon Sangmu FC players
Ulsan Hyundai FC players
Daegu FC players
K League 1 players
Dankook University alumni
Korea National League players
South Korea international footballers
FC Seoul non-playing staff